A mechanical or physical shock is a sudden acceleration caused, for example, by impact, drop, kick, earthquake, or explosion.  Shock is a transient physical excitation.

Shock describes matter subject to extreme rates of force with respect to time. Shock is a vector that has units of an acceleration (rate of change of velocity).  The unit g (or g) represents multiples of the acceleration of gravity and is conventionally used.

A shock pulse can be characterised by its peak acceleration, the duration, and the shape of the shock pulse (half sine, triangular, trapezoidal, etc.).  The shock response spectrum is a method for further evaluating a mechanical shock.

Shock measurement
Shock measurement is of interest in several fields such as
Propagation of heel shock through a runner's body
Measure the  magnitude of a shock need to cause damage to an item: fragility.
Measure shock attenuation through athletic flooring 
Measuring the effectiveness of a shock absorber
Measuring the shock absorbing ability of package cushioning
Measure the ability of an athletic helmet to protect people
Measure the effectiveness of shock mounts
Determining the ability of structures to resist seismic shock: earthquakes, etc.
Determining whether personal protective fabric attenuates or amplifies shocks
Verifying that a Naval ship and its equipment can survive explosive shocks 

Shocks are usually measured by accelerometers but other transducers and high speed imaging are also used. A wide variety of laboratory instrumentation is available; stand-alone shock data loggers are also used.

Field shocks are highly variable and often have very uneven shapes.   Even laboratory controlled shocks often have uneven shapes and include short duration spikes;  Noise can be reduced by appropriate digital or analog filtering.

Governing test methods and specifications provide detail about the conduct of shock tests. Proper placement of measuring instruments is critical.  Fragile items and packaged goods respond with variation to uniform laboratory shocks; Replicate testing is often called for. For example, MIL-STD-810G Method 516.6 indicates: ''at least three times in both directions along each of three orthogonal axes".

Shock testing

Shock testing typically falls into two categories, classical shock testing and pyroshock or ballistic shock testing.  Classical shock testing consists of the following shock impulses: half sine, haversine, sawtooth wave, and trapezoid.  Pyroshock and ballistic shock tests are specialized and are not considered classical shocks. Classical shocks can be performed on Electro Dynamic (ED) Shakers, Free Fall Drop Tower or Pneumatic Shock Machines.  A classical shock impulse is created when the shock machine table changes direction abruptly. This abrupt change in direction causes a rapid velocity change which creates the shock impulse.  Testing the effects of shock are sometimes conducted on end-use applications: for example, automobile crash tests.

Use of proper test methods and Verification and validation protocols are important for all phases of testing and evaluation.

Effects of shock 
Mechanical shock has the potential for damaging an item (e.g., an entire light bulb) or an element of the item (e.g. a filament in an Incandescent light bulb):
 A brittle or fragile item can fracture. For example, two crystal wine glasses may shatter when impacted against each other. A shear pin in an engine is designed to fracture with a specific magnitude of shock.  Note that a soft ductile material may sometimes exhibit brittle failure during shock due to time-temperature superposition.
 A malleable item can be bent by a shock. For example, a copper pitcher may bend when dropped on the floor.
 Some items may appear to be not damaged by a single shock but will experience fatigue failure with numerous repeated low-level shocks.
 A shock may result in only minor damage which may not be critical for use. However, cumulative minor damage from several shocks will eventually result in the item being unusable.
 A shock may not produce immediate apparent damage but might cause the service life of the product to be shortened: the reliability is reduced.
 A shock may cause an item to become out of adjustment. For example, when a precision scientific instrument is subjected to a moderate shock, good metrology practice may be to have it recalibrated before further use.
 Some materials such as primary high explosives may detonate with mechanical shock or impact.
 When glass bottles of liquid are dropped or subjected to shock, the water hammer effect may cause hydrodynamic glass breakage.

Considerations 
When laboratory testing, field experience, or engineering judgement indicates that an item could be damaged by mechanical shock, several courses of action might be considered:
 Reduce and control the input shock at the source.
 Modify the item to improve its toughness or support it to better handle shocks.
 Use shock absorbers, shock mounts, or cushions to control the shock transmitted to the item.  Cushioning reduces the peak acceleration by extending the duration of the shock.
 Plan for failures: accept certain losses.  Have redundant systems available, etc.

See also 

 
 
 
 
 
 
 
 
 
 
 
 
 
 
 
 
 
 
 
 
  Section 516.6, Shock

Notes

Further reading 

 DeSilva, C. W., "Vibration and Shock Handbook", CRC, 2005, 
 Harris, C. M., and Peirsol, A. G. "Shock and Vibration Handbook", 2001, McGraw Hill, 
ISO 18431:2007 - Mechanical vibration and shock
 ASTM D6537, Standard Practice for Instrumented Package Shock Testing for Determination of Package Performance.
 MIL-STD-810G, Environmental Test Methods and Engineering Guidelines, 2000, sect 516.6
 Brogliato, B., "Nonsmooth Mechanics. Models, Dynamics and Control", Springer London, 2nd Edition, 1999.

External links
Response to mechanical shock, Department of Energy, 
 Shock Response Spectrum, a primer, 
 A Study in the Application of SRS, 

Mechanics
Packaging
Fracture mechanics
Acceleration